Bobby Ryan (born 1987) is an American ice hockey player.

Bobby Ryan may also refer to:
 Bobby Ryan (footballer) (born 1979), Irish footballer
 Bobby Ryan (hurler) (born 1961), retired Irish hurler

See also
 Bob Ryan (disambiguation)
 Robert Ryan (disambiguation)